Bret William Walker  (born 1954) is an Australian barrister.

Family

Walker is the son of an Anglican minister. His second wife is Sarah Pritchard.

Education
Walker was educated at Concord West Public School and The King's School, Parramatta. He graduated with degrees in arts and law from the University of Sydney.

Career
Walker was admitted to the New South Wales bar in 1979 and was appointed senior counsel in 1993. He was president of the New South Wales Bar Association from November 2001 to November 2003, having been vice-president from 1996 to 2001.

Walker is a member of the Council of Law Reporting for New South Wales, and has been editor of the NSW Law Reports since 2006. He is a patron of the State Library of New South Wales as a foundation senior fellow and has been a member of the NSW Health Clinical Ethics Advisory Panel since 2003. He was governor of the Law Foundation of NSW from 1996 to 2007, and Special Commissioner of Inquiry for the NSW government into Sydney Ferries in 2007. He was a foundation member and has been director of the Australian Academy of Law since 2007.

He was one of the leading legal counsel representing tobacco companies in their unsuccessful fight against the Australian government's plain packaging legislation.

In April 2011, Walker was appointed as the Independent National Security Legislation Monitor. In 2015, Walker said that a proposed change to Australia's citizenship laws to give the Minister for Immigration the power to strip citizenship from people who support terrorism was unconstitutional. He said this was a misquote of the INSLM 2014 report by Prime Minister Tony Abbott. In a 2015 interview with Lateline, Walker noted the Australian "habit of seeing a problem and passing a law about it".

In 2018/19, Walker oversaw the South Australian Royal Commsion into the Murray-Darling Basin. The report was damning of the maladministration that characterised the overseeing Murray-Darling Basin Authority, describing their decision-making as “incomprehensible” and “indefensible”. 

In 2019, Walker successfully acted in the appeal to the High Court of Australia of Cardinal George Pell, whose child sex abuse convictions were overturned on 7 April 2020.

In April 2020 Walker was appointed to a Special Commission of Inquiry to "… investigate all matters and agencies involved with the Ruby Princess' departure and its return to Circular Quay on March 19".

In 2021, Walker had the most appearances in the High Court of Australia, appearing 35 times; that was more than twice the number of hearings as the next busiest, Solicitor-General Stephen Donaghue QC.

High Court appearances
Bell Lawyers Pty Ltd v Pentelow [2019] HCA 29

Pell v The Queen [2020] HCA 12

Workpac Pty Ltd v Rossato [2021] HCA 23

References

1954 births
Living people
Fellows of the Australian Academy of Law
Australian barristers
Australian Senior Counsel
Sydney Law School alumni
University of Sydney alumni
People educated at The King's School, Parramatta
Lawyers from Sydney
Officers of the Order of Australia